Sayyid Shamseddin Hosseini (born 1967) is an Iranian politician, who served as the minister of economic affairs and finance from 2008 to 2013.

Early life and education
Hosseini was born in Isfahan, Iran, in 1967. He holds a PhD in economics from Islamic Azad University.

Career
Hosseini taught at Islamic Azad University, Payame Noor University and Allameh Tabatabai University. In 2007, he was appointed minister of economic affairs and finance, replacing Danesh Jaafari. Hosseini's term ended on 15 August 2013 and he was replaced by Ali Tayebnia in the post. After leaving office, Hosseini was appointed vice president of Iranian University on 20 August formed by Mahmoud Ahmedinejad.

References

1967 births
Living people
Islamic Azad University alumni
People from Mazandaran Province
Academic staff of Allameh Tabataba'i University
Spokespersons of the Government of Iran
Finance ministers of Iran
Iranian sportsperson-politicians
Impeached Iranian officials
People from Tonekabon
Academic staff of Payame Noor University
21st-century Iranian politicians